Llanaber is a linear coastal village in north west Wales, about  north of Barmouth on the A496 road. The Irish Sea lies directly to the west and the Rhiniog mountains directly to the east.

Facilities
Its main attraction is the large beach which is used for a range of recreational activities including horse riding, cycling, rounders, cricket and football.
A protective promenade gives access to Barmouth town centre.

It is served by hourly bus services and Llanaber railway station on the Cambrian train line.

The village contains a number of rural holiday cottages, small hotels. and holiday parks for caravan and camping during the summer.

Church
Within the village is a 13th-century parish church and Grade I listed building, St Mary and St Bodfan Church.

The church was built in the early 13th century by Hywel ap Gruffudd ap Cynan who was a great grandson of Owain Gwynedd. It has a flagstone floor and a 16th-century timber roof.

It has undergone two major restorations. The first one was in 1860. The small bell tower was rebuilt as well as most of the west wall. A small vestry was constructed on the north side of the chancel and stained glass windows were installed.

The second restoration was in 1969. The wood in roof was treated or replaced. The seating of the church was also renewed with spare pews given to St Mary's church from the nearby St John's Church, Barmouth. A Compton organ of two manuals and pedalboard was also given to the church by the Bishop of Bangor, James Colquhoun Campbell.

Gallery

References

Villages in Gwynedd
Barmouth